"Be Still My Beating Heart" is a song by Sting, from his second studio album, ...Nothing Like the Sun; released as the second US single from the album. In 1989 the song was nominated for Song of the Year and Best Male Pop Vocal Performance at the 31st Annual Grammy Awards.

Former Police bandmate Andy Summers played guitar on the track. The song appeared in the 2000 film Dolphins; Sting also wrote the score for the film. The track has since appeared on The Best of Sting: Fields of Gold 1984–1994 compilation album among others.

Single release
The song was also released as a single, and reached #15 on the US Billboard Hot 100, #37 Hot Adult Contemporary Tracks and #2 on the Hot Mainstream Rock Tracks charts, respectively. It was only released as a single in Japan, South Africa, Australia, Canada & United States. There are two single edit-length versions of the track (3:59) and (4:40).

Music video
The music video for the song was directed by Candace Reckinger and her husband Michael Patterson. The video later appeared on The Best of Sting: Fields of Gold 1984-1994 compilation VHS home video.

Charts

References

External links

Sting (musician) songs
1987 singles
A&M Records singles
1987 songs